Moulay Haddou (born June 14, 1975 in Oran, Algeria) is a retired Algerian international footballer. He last played for MC Oran in the Algerian Championnat National.

National team statistics

Honours 
Club:
 Won the Algerian Cup once with MC Oran in 1996
 Won the Algerian League Cup once with MC Oran in 1996
 Won the Arab Cup Winners' Cup twice with MC Oran in 1997 and 1998
 Won the Arab Super Cup once with MC Oran in 1999
 Finalist of the Arab Champions League once with MC Oran in 2001
 Won the Algerian League once with USM Alger in 2005
 Runner-up of the Algerian League four times with MC Oran in 1995, 1996, 1997 and 2000
 Finalist of the Algerian Cup three times:
 Twice with MC Oran in 1998 and 2002
 Once with USM Alger in 2006
 Participated in 3 editions of the African Cup of Nations: 2000, 2002 and 2004
 Has 56 caps and 1 goal for the Algerian National Team

References 

1975 births
2004 African Cup of Nations players
2000 African Cup of Nations players
2002 African Cup of Nations players
Algerian footballers
Algeria international footballers
Algeria under-23 international footballers
Competitors at the 1997 Mediterranean Games
ASM Oran players
Living people
MC Oran players
Footballers from Oran
USM Alger players
Association football defenders
Mediterranean Games competitors for Algeria
21st-century Algerian people